Morir de amor may refer to:

 Morir de Amor (album), by Conjunto Primavera
 "Morir de amor" (Miguel Bosé song) 1980
 "Morir de amor" (Kudai song), 2009
 "Morir d'amor", a 1959 song by Tony Renis

See also
"Mourir d'aimer", song by Charles Aznavour